Gabriel Mărgărit (born 12 July 1971) is a Romanian former footballer who played as a midfielder for teams such as Faur București, Rocar București, Henan Construction, Inter Gaz București or CS Otopeni, among others. Mărgărit played in more than 360 matches at the level of Liga I and Liga II and during the 2008–09 season he was manager, player and captain of CS Otopeni.

After retirement, Mărgărit started to work as an assistant coach for teams such as Pandurii Târgu Jiu, Sportul Studențesc, Steaua București, Concordia Chiajna or FC Brașov. Since 2017, Gabriel Mărgărit is the assistant coach of Marius Șumudică and worked with him in Turkey and Saudi Arabia, for team such as Kayserispor, Gaziantep and Al-Shabab.

References

External links
 
 
 

1971 births
Living people
Footballers from Bucharest
Romanian footballers
Association football midfielders
Liga I players
Liga II players
Faur București players
FC Sportul Studențesc București players
AFC Rocar București players
FC U Craiova 1948 players
CSM Ceahlăul Piatra Neamț players
CS Inter Gaz București players
CS Otopeni players
China League One players
Henan Songshan Longmen F.C. players
Romanian expatriate footballers
Romanian expatriate sportspeople in China
Expatriate footballers in China
Romanian football managers
CS Otopeni managers
FC Steaua București assistant managers
Romanian expatriate football managers
Romanian expatriate sportspeople in Turkey
Expatriate football managers in Turkey
Romanian expatriate sportspeople in Saudi Arabia
Expatriate football managers in Saudi Arabia